The Saidina Umar Al Khattab Mosque (MSUAK) (Malay: Masjid Saidina Umar Al Khattab) is a prominent mosque in Bukit Damansara (Damansara Heights), Kuala Lumpur, Malaysia. The mosque was officially opened on 22 March 1984 by the seventh Yang di-Pertuan Agong, Sultan Ahmad Shah of Pahang and was named after Muhammad's successor (Caliph) Umar Al Khattab.

See also
Islam in Malaysia

Mosques completed in 1984
19th-century mosques
Mosques in Kuala Lumpur